The Wipper is a river in Thuringia, Germany, left tributary of the Unstrut. It originates in the Eichsfeld area, northwestern Thuringia, near Leinefelde-Worbis. The total length of the Wipper is 95 km. The Wipper joins the Unstrut near Heldrungen. Towns along the Wipper include Bleicherode and Sondershausen.

See also
 List of rivers of Thuringia

Rivers of Thuringia
Rivers of Germany